Deng Pufang (born 16 April 1944) is the eldest son of former Chinese Vice Premier Deng Xiaoping.  He is mostly known for being injured by the Red Guards and becoming a paraplegic. He has since dedicated his life to improving the rights of people with disabilities.

Biography
Deng Pufang was born to Deng Xiaoping and Zhuo Lin, his third wife, in Zuoquan, Jinzhong, Shanxi. He is considered a member of the Crown Prince Party.

Paralyzing injury
During the Cultural Revolution, Deng Xiaoping and his family were targeted by Mao Zedong. He was branded as a capitalist roader. In one session, he was forced to kneel to the ground with his arm stretched out behind him and over his head. His family watched as the students forced him to confess to capitalist ways of thinking.

Mao's Red Guards then imprisoned Deng Pufang. He was tortured and thrown out of the window of a three-story building at Peking University in 1968, but some sources claimed he may have fallen or jumped out of the window himself. His back broken, he was rushed to the hospital, but was denied admission. By the time he reached another clinic, he was paralyzed. He remains a paraplegic, using a wheelchair.

With regard to his views on the Cultural Revolution, Deng Pufang once said, "The generation of the Cultural Revolution is in no sense a lost generation, as is often said. Quite to the contrary. All those who passed through that testing have been toughened. These people think a great deal, and have their own ideas. They are firm in their convictions, and show initiative. To my way of thinking this generation represents a trump card for China and for the reforms which they have set in motion."

Post-injury work
In 1984 Deng Pufang established the China Welfare Fund for the Disabled. Then, he founded and became the chairman of the China Disabled Persons' Federation in 1988. In 1987, he was the prime mover behind a national survey for people with disabilities. In 1990, he led the formation of the Chinese Rehabilitation and Research Association for the Mentally Disabled.  In 1991, legislation was passed to recognize mental illness as a disability.

He was awarded the United Nations Human Rights Prize in December 2003 for his work in protecting the rights of individuals with disability in China.

The International Paralympic Committee awarded Deng the Paralympic Order at their November 2005 meeting in Beijing.It was the first year the award was offered to one recipient only; in the past, gold, silver, and bronze medals were awarded.

Deng also helped organize the 2008 Beijing Olympics as the executive president of the Beijing Organizing Committee.

References

External links 
 Deng Pufang's Biography

1944 births
Living people
Chinese disability rights activists
Chinese torture victims
Politicians from Jinzhong
Chinese politicians with disabilities
Politicians with paraplegia
People's Republic of China politicians from Shanxi
Vice Chairpersons of the National Committee of the Chinese People's Political Consultative Conference
Victims of the Cultural Revolution
Deng Xiaoping family
Recipients of the Olympic Order
Chinese Communist Party politicians from Shanxi
Chinese politicians of Hakka descent
Children of national leaders of China